Bill McGuire may refer to:
Bill McGuire (volcanologist) (born 1954), British volcanologist
Bill McGuire (baseball) (born 1964), former Major League Baseball catcher
Bill McGuire (footballer), Irish soccer player during the 1930s
Bill McGuire (murder victim), a man killed by his wife in 2004
Billy McGuire, one of the World's Heaviest Twins

See also
William McGuire (disambiguation)